Rutte is a Dutch surname originally meaning "son of Rut". Notable people with this surname include:

 Arno Rutte (born 1972), Dutch politician
 Mark Rutte (born 1967), Dutch politician
 Mary L. Rutte, sponsor of the 
 Joseph Rutte, a Quaker and business partner of Richard Tapper Cadbury

See also 
 First Rutte cabinet, government cabinet of the Netherlands (2010–2012)
 Second Rutte cabinet, government cabinet of the Netherlands (2012–2017)
 Third Rutte cabinet, government cabinet of the Netherlands (2017-2022)
 Fourth Rutte cabinet, government cabinet of the Netherlands (2022-present)
 Rutten (disambiguation)

Dutch-language surnames
Patronymic surnames